Contempt is an intense feeling or attitude of regarding someone or something as inferior, base, or worthless.

Contempt or contemptible may also refer to:

 Contempt (album), by Assemblage 23
 Contempt (film), by Jean-Luc Godard 
 Contempt of Congress
 Contempt of court 
 Contempt of Parliament
 The Old Contemptibles, the British Expeditionary Force in World War I

See also